The African Cup of Champions Clubs 1969 was the 5th edition of the annual international club football competition held in the CAF region (Africa), the African Cup of Champions Clubs. It determined that year's club champion of association football in Africa.

The tournament was played by 20 teams and used a knock-out format with ties played home and away. Ismaily SC from United Arab Republic won the final, and became CAF club champion for the first time, beating Congo-Kinshasa's TP Englebert, who made their third final in a row.

Preliminary round

|}
1 US Cattin withdrew.

First round

|}
1 US FRAN withdrew after the first leg.

Quarter-finals

|}
1 Asante Kotoko won after drawing of lots.

Semi-finals

|}

Final

Champion

Top scorers
The top scorers from the 1969 African Cup of Champions Clubs are as follows:

External links
African Cup of Champions results at Rec.Sport.Soccer Statistics Foundation

1
African Cup of Champions Clubs